Sedat Bayrak (born 10 April 1981) is a Turkish professional footballer who last played as a center back for Ankaragücü.

Club career
Bayrak began his career with local club Yomraspor in 1992. He spent seven years at the club before moving on to another local club, Trabzonspor. The club loaned him out to Erzurumspor for the  2000–01 season, and he was transferred to Akçaabat Sebatspor at the end of the season. He made 102 appearances for the club before he was transferred to MKE Ankaragücü in 2005. Sivasspor transferred him in 2007.

International career
He received his first call up to the Turkey national football team during UEFA Euro 2008 qualifying. He was in the match squad for a match against Bosnia and Herzegovina, but did not make an appearance. He also has two caps for the Turkey A2 team.

References

External links
 

1981 births
Living people
People from Yomra
Turkish footballers
Turkey B international footballers
Trabzonspor footballers
Erzurumspor footballers
Akçaabat Sebatspor footballers
MKE Ankaragücü footballers
Sivasspor footballers
Orduspor footballers
Elazığspor footballers
Gençlerbirliği S.K. footballers
Süper Lig players
Association football defenders